Le Bassin Aux Nymphéas (Water Lily Pond; 1919) is one of the series of Water Lilies paintings by French impressionist artist Claude Monet. It is an oil on canvas painting measuring 300x100 cm.

Exhibited
Paris, Galerie Bernheim-Jeune, Monet, January - February 1921, no. 44 or 45.
Pittsburgh, Carnegie Institute, Art and Science in Gardens, June - July 1922, no. 101.
New York, Durand Ruel Galleries, Waterlilies by Claude Monet, February 1924, no. 1-4.
Paris, Galerie Durand-Ruel, Hommage à Claude Monet, 1926. Philadelphia, Arts Club, Monet, Memorial Exhibition, April 2001
Sotheby's, New York, May 1971, (Auction Exhibition)
London, Christie's, June 2008, (Auction Exhibition)
Painted in 1919 in Giverny, it has been seen in public just once in the past 80 years.

Provenance
1919 - acquired from the artist in November by Bernheim-Jeune, Paris
1921 - in January, is noted to be owned jointly by Bernheim-Jeune and Galerie Durand-Ruel, Paris
1922 - owned solely by Galerie Durand-Ruel, Paris (nos. 11874 and D13373), by 1922.
Unknown - Jean d'Alayer (Mme d'Alayer, née Marie-Louise Durand-Ruel), Paris
Unknown - Sam Salz, Inc., New York.
1968 - Mr and Mrs Norton Simon, Los Angeles, circa 1968
1971 - Sotheby's, New York, 5 May 1971, lot 41.
1971 - Mrs Elizabeth Clementine Miller Tangeman, Columbus, Indiana, acquired from the above for $320,000
1993 - J. Irwin and Xenia S. Miller, acquired from the above, August 1993.
2008 - Christie's, London, 24 June 2008, lot 16. for £36.5m, overall price rose to over £40m with taxes.
2008 - Arts & Management International Ltd. for Private Collector

Articles on this work
M. Ciolkowska, "Monet: His Garden, His World", in International Studio, February 1923, no. 309, pp. 371–377 (illustrated p. 378).
D. Rouart, J.-D. Rey & R. Maillard, Monet: Nymphéas, Paris, 1972, (illustrated p. 174).
M. Hoog, Monet, Paris, 1978, no. 80 (illustrated).
R. Gordon & C.F. Stuckey, "Blossoms and Blunders: Monet and the State", in Art in America, January - February 1979, p. 110.
D. Wildenstein, Claude Monet: biographie et catalogue raisonné, vol. IV, 1899-1926, Lausanne and Paris, 1985, no. 1890, p. 288 (illustrated p. 289).
D. Wildenstein, Claude Monet: catalogue raisonné, vol. IV, Cologne, 1996, no. 1890 (illustrated p. 897).
S. Muchnic, Odd Man In: Norton Simon and the Pursuit of Culture, Berkeley and Los Angeles, 1998, pp. 192–193.
P. Hayes Tucker, "The Revolution in the Garden: Monet in the Twentieth Century", in exh. cat., Monet in the Twentieth Century, Royal Academy of Arts, London, 1999, pp. 79 and 218.

Posthumous Auction sales
1971 - Sotheby's, New York, May 1971, $320,000
2008 - Christie's, London, June 2008, $80,451,178 becoming an auction record for a painting by Claude Monet, and the second highest price for a work of art in Europe.

It was sold on 24 June 2008 at Christie's London auction rooms for £40.9m,[1] a world record for a Monet painting.[2]

See also
 Nymphaeaceae (water lilies)
 List of most expensive paintings

References

External links
Monet's Years at Giverny: Beyond Impressionism, exhibition catalog fully online as PDF from The Metropolitan Museum of Art, which contains material on this work

Paintings by Claude Monet
1919 paintings
Water in art